Charles Wilhem Rinn (6 September 1849, in Marseille – 1929, in Paris) was a French hellenist and lexicographer, mostly known for his textbooks.

Biography 
He was agrégé in grammar in 1894. After he completed his studies at the École normale supérieure (1870-1874) he received a two-year assignment as teacher at the lycée de Laval (1874-1875). He later taught at the Collège Rollin in 1875, then at the Lycée Fontanes in 1882, where he ended his career in 1912. He also was a teacher at the maisons d'éducation de la Légion d'Honneur from 1890. In 1893-1894, Roger Martin du Gard was his pupil. In 1895, he was made a chevalier of the Légion d'honneur and an officer in 1913.

Publications

Essays and textbooks 
 Discours prononcé par M. Rinn, à la distribution des prix du collège Rollin le 7 août 1877
 Morale et patrie : lectures à l’usage des écoles primaires (in collaboration with Alfred Mézières 1885, reprinted in 1894 and 1900)
 Nouvelle grammaire française de A. Chassang... revue, modifiée et simplifiée (in collaboration with Louis Humbert 1892, reprinted in 1901, 1903 and 1907)
 384 dictées choisies... suivies de devoirs oraux et écrits (in collaboration with Louis Humbert), 1895
 Notice sur Deltour (Félix), 1822-1904 (in collaboration with Ernest Dupuy), 1904

Commentated editions

Cicero 
 [M. Tullii Ciceronis pro Archia poeta oratio, 1881, (reprinted in 1894)
 [M. Tullii Ciceronis Cato major de Senectute liber ad T. Pomponium Atticum, 1882

Cornelius Nepos 
 Cornelii Nepotis opera (in collaboration with L.-Wilhelm Rinn) ; 1878, reprinted in 1884

Herodotus 
 Les Histoires d’Hérodote : notice, analyse et extraits (in collaboration with Félix Deltour), 1894

Homer 
 L’Iliade et l’Odyssée : notice, analyse et extraits (in collaboration with Félix Deltour), 1894

Jean Racine 
 Les Plaideurs, 1882

L.-Wilhelm Rinn 
 Cours gradué de thèmes latins..., 1878
 Littérature, composition et style : leçons professées dans les cours spéciaux de l’Hôtel de ville de Paris, 1880, (reprinted in 1886 and 1891)

Livy 
 Tite-Live : notice, analyse et extraits (in collaboration with Félix Deltour), 1894

Virgil 
 Virgile : notice, analyse et extraits (in collaboration with Félix Deltour), 1894

Xénophon 
 Extraits de l’Anabase et de la Cyropédie, 1889, (reprinted in 1899)
 Xénophon : notice, analyse et extraits, 1894, (in collaboration with Félix Deltour)

Collective collections 
 Choix de morceaux traduits des auteurs grecs (in collaboration with Félix Deltour, 1884, reprinted in 1885, 1889, 1892, 1895 and 1907)
 Choix de morceaux traduits des auteurs latins (in collaboration with Félix Deltour, 1885, reprinted in 1892 and 1895)
 La Tragédie grecque : analyses et extraits du théâtre d’Eschyle, de Sophocle et d’Euripide (in collaboration with Félix Deltour ; reprinted in 1896), 1887
 Analyses et extraits des auteurs grecs et des auteurs latins, 1893, (in collaboration with Félix Deltour)

References 

Writers from Marseille
1849 births
1929 deaths
French hellenists
French lexicographers
19th-century French writers
École Normale Supérieure alumni
Officiers of the Légion d'honneur
19th-century French translators